Capital High School is a four-year public high school in the western United States, located in Helena, Montana.  The building was originally built in the 1960s as a Catholic high school, but closed following the graduation of the class of 1969.  The property was purchased by the Helena Public School District and it became its second high school  in 1973.

Notable Administration/Coaches
 Pat Murphy (football coach) -  Head Football Coach. Has won 6 State titles as Head Coach (most recent 2011 State Champion)

National and State Awards received

In 2011, Capital High's Physical Education program was named 1 of 3 schools nationally as a NASPE STARS Program . This award is given to schools whose P.E programs model the essential elements for a quality physical education as well as providing valuable opportunities for all students to learn meaningful lessons. Capital is 1 of 59 schools to have ever received this award.
Dennis Peterson was recognized by Stanford University's Teacher Tribute Initiative.
J.D. Solomon (History/Social Studies Teacher at CHS,) was inducted into the Carroll College Hall of Fame for his basketball career.  J.D. Solomon played basketball for Carroll from 1996–2001. After being tabbed a second team all-conference selection as a sophomore, he earned first team all-conference recognition his final two years (2000 and 2001). As a senior in 2000–01, the 6-foot-7 Solomon became the first Carroll hoopster to make first team All-American, averaging 20.2 points and 7.7 rebounds. Solomon led the team to a then-record 26 wins and a No. 11 national ranking. The Saints won the 2001 Frontier Conference and qualified for the NAIA tournament for just the fourth time in school history. His 1,848 career points rank No. 2 on the school's all-time list
Tom Pedersen (Capital High School Science teacher) is named 2012 Montana Teacher of the Year
Lon Carter (Original Head Boys Basketball Coach, and Current Head Boys Track And Field Coach as well as Coordinating summer weightlifting and DOTS conditioning program) is Named Top High School Athletic Program for the State of Montana by Sports Illustrated for his years of service and dedication to the Bruin Athletic department

Notable alumni 

 Stuart Long (19632014), Class of 1981, boxer-turned-Catholic priest; inspiration for the 2022 film Father Stu
 Dava Newman (born 1964), Class of 1982, engineer and NASA administrator 
 Bobby Petrino (born 1961), Class of 1979, college football head coach
 Paul Petrino (born 1967), Class of 1985, college football head coach

References

External links

Max Preps – Capital Bruins
Public high schools in Montana
Schools in Lewis and Clark County, Montana
1973 establishments in Montana